Henry Cromwell (1628–1674) was son of Lord Protector Oliver Cromwell and served as Lord Deputy of Ireland.

Henry Cromwell may also refer to:
 Henry Cromwell, 2nd Baron Cromwell (1538–1592), English peer
 Sir Henry Williams (alias Cromwell) (died 1604), Member of Parliament for Huntingdonshire
 Henry Cromwell-Williams (1625–1673), Member of Parliament for Huntingdonshire